Galectin-10 is an enzyme that in humans is encoded by the CLC gene.

Lysophospholipases are enzymes that act on biological membranes to regulate the multifunctional lysophospholipids. The protein encoded by this gene is a lysophospholipase expressed in eosinophils and basophils. It hydrolyzes lysophosphatidylcholine to glycerophosphocholine and a free fatty acid. This protein may possess carbohydrate or IgE-binding activities. It is both structurally and functionally related to the galectin family of beta-galactoside binding proteins. It may be associated with inflammation and some myeloid leukemias.

See also
 Charcot-Leyden crystals

References

External links

Further reading